Syrian language may refer to:

 Languages of Syria, several dialects of Arabic as well as other languages without official status
 Syrian Arabic language, encompassing all variants of Arabic language in Syria
 Syrian Turkish language, encompassing all variants of Turkish language in Syria
 Syrian Hebrew language, referring to local variants of Hebrew language in Syria
 Neo-Aramaic language in Syria, referring to all variants of Neo-Aramaic language in Syria
 Palaeo-Syrian language or Eblaite, an extinct Semitic language
 Syriac language, an Aramaic language that emerged during the first century AD, literary language of various Christian communities

See also
 Syrian (disambiguation)